The 1978 Kansas City Royals season was their tenth in Major League Baseball. The Royals won their third consecutive American League West title with a record of 92-70. For the third postseason in a row, Kansas City lost to the New York Yankees, falling 3-1 in the 1978 American League Championship Series.

Regular season

Season standings

Record vs. opponents

Notable transactions 
 April 4, 1978: John Mayberry was purchased from the Royals by the Toronto Blue Jays.
 June 5, 1978: The Royals traded a player to be named later to the San Diego Padres for Steve Hamrick (minors). The Royals completed the deal by sending Gary Lance to the Padres on September 29.
 August 3, 1978: Gerry Ako (minors) and cash were traded by the Royals to the Milwaukee Brewers for Jamie Quirk.

Draft picks 
 June 6, 1978: 1978 Major League Baseball draft
Jeff Cornell was drafted by the Royals in the 8th round.
Frank Viola was drafted by the Royals in the 16th round, but did not sign.

Roster

Player stats

Batting

Starters by position 
Note: Pos = Position; G = Games played; AB = At bats; H = Hits; Avg. = Batting average; HR = Home runs; RBI = Runs batted in

Other batters 
Note: G = Games played; AB = At bats; H = Hits; Avg. = Batting average; HR = Home runs; RBI = Runs batted in

Pitching

Starting pitchers 
Note: G = Games pitched; IP = Innings pitched; W = Wins; L = Losses; ERA = Earned run average; SO = Strikeouts

Other pitchers 
Note: G = Games pitched; IP = Innings pitched; W = Wins; L = Losses; ERA = Earned run average; SO = Strikeouts

Relief pitchers 
Note: G = Games pitched; W = Wins; L = Losses; SV = Saves; ERA = Earned run average; SO = Strikeouts

ALCS

Game 1 
October 3: Royals Stadium

Game 2 
October 4: Royals Stadium

Game 3 
October 6: Yankee Stadium

Game 4 
October 7: Yankee Stadium

Farm system 

LEAGUE CHAMPIONS: Omaha

Notes

References

External links 
1978 Kansas City Royals at Baseball Reference
1978 Kansas City Royals at Baseball Almanac

Kansas City Royals seasons
Kansas City Royals season
American League West champion seasons
Kansas City